Gösterli, formerly known as Sasima, is a village in North-East Niğde. It is also located at the South-West part of historical site Cappadocia.
The population was 1,711 at the 2009 census.

References 

Cappadocia
Villages in Niğde Province